Alegría is a studio album by saxophonist Wayne Shorter released on Verve Records in 2003. It is the second album to feature the 'Footprints Quartet' of Shorter, pianist Danilo Perez, bassist John Patitucci and drummer Brian Blade.

The piece "Orbits" is a complete and quasi-orchestral re-imagining of the song of the same name, originally recorded by the Second Miles Davis Quintet and released on the album Miles Smiles in 1967. "Capricorn 2" revisits another Shorter composition first recorded by Davis in 1967 (though not released until 1976 on the primarily Shorter-composed Water Babies), while "Angola" dates from Shorter's own 1965 album, The Soothsayer.

Reception

The Allmusic review by Richard S. Ginell awarded the album 4 stars, stating that "this disc seemed to confirm a long-awaited creative Indian summer for Wayne Shorter." Similarly, contemporaneous reviews by Ben Ratliff of The New York Times and CMJ New Music Reports Tad Hendrickson happily noted Shorter's return to form.  Los Angeles Times critic Don Heckman commended both the album's "startling diversity" and the "imaginative, high-flying freedom [that characterizes] Shorter's playing," adding that Alegria offered "convincing testimony to Shorter's undiminished creativity."

In February 2004, Shorter's efforts resulted in two Grammy Awards: Best Jazz Instrumental Album and Best Instrumental Composition (for "Sacajawea").

 Track listing 
All compositions by Wayne Shorter except where noted.
 "Sacajawea" – 7:40  
 "Serenata" (Leroy Anderson, Arr. Shorter) – 6:09  
 "Vendiendo Alegría" (Malka Himel, Joso Špralja, Arr. Shorter) – 7:03  
 "Bachianas Brasileiras No. 5" (Heitor Villa-Lobos, Arr. Robert Sadin) – 6:00  
 "Angola" – 5:28  
 "Interlude" – 1:49  
 "She Moves Through the Fair" (Traditional, Arr. Shorter) – 4:39  
 "Orbits" – 6:09  
 "12th Century Carol" (Anonymous, Arr. Shorter) – 6:04  
 "Capricorn 2" – 5:59

 Personnel Footprints Quartet Wayne Shorter – soprano saxophone (1, 2, 3, 5, 7, 9), tenor saxophone (1, 4-8, 10), arrangements (2, 3, 5, 7, 8, 9)
 Danilo Perez – acoustic piano (1, 3, 7, 9, 10)
 John Patitucci – bass (1, 2, 4, 5, 7-10)
 Brian Blade – drums (1, 2, 6, 7, 8, 10)
Note: The 'Footprints Quartet' appear intact on tracks 1, 7 & 10.Others Robert Sadin – conductor (2, 3, 8, 9), arrangements (4)
 Brad Mehldau – acoustic piano (2, 5, 8)
 Terri Lyne Carrington – drums (3, 5, 9)
 Alex Acuña – percussion (3, 4, 5, 9)
 Frank Morelli – bassoon (2, 8)
 Allen Blustine – clarinet (2, 3, 8), bass clarinet (2, 3, 8)
 Chris Potter – bass clarinet (5), tenor saxophone (5)
 Paul Lustig Dunkel – flute (2, 3, 8)
 Stephen Taylor – English horn (2, 8), oboe (2, 8)
 John Clark – French horn (3, 9), alto horn (9)
 Stewart Rose – French horn (3, 9)
 Bruce Eidem – trombone (3, 9)
 Jim Pugh – trombone (3, 5)
 Papo Vázquez – trombone (3)
 Steve Davis – trombone (5)
 Michael Boschen – trombone (9)
 Chris Gekker – trumpet (3, 9)
 Lew Soloff – trumpet (3, 9)
 Jeremy Pelt – trumpet (5)
 Marcus Rojas – tuba (9)
 Charles Curtis – cello (2, 8), cello solo (4)
 David Garrett, Barry Gold, Gloria Lum, Daniel Rothmuller, Brent Samuel and Cecilia Tsan – cello ensemble (4)

 Production 
 Robert Sadin – producer, mixing 
 Richard Seidel – executive producer 
 Clark Germain – special production assistance, recording, additional mix engineer 
 David Darlington – special production assistance, mixing 
 Todd Whitelock – additional mix engineer 
 Dick Kondas – mix assistant 
 Steve Mazur – mix assistant
 Mike Peters – mix assistant
 Shane Koss – audio technical consultant 
 PK Pandey – audio technical consultant 
 Mark Wilder – mastering 
 Seth Foster – mastering assistant 
 Marsha Black – production coordinator 
 Camille Tominaro – production coordinator 
 Theodora Kuslan – release coordinator
 Kelly Pratt – release coordinator 
 Hollis King – art direction
 Sachico Asano – design 
 Kate Garner – photography Studios'
 Recorded at Cello Studios (Hollywood, California); Avatar Studios, Clinton Recording Studios, Sear Sound and Burning Kite Studio (New York City, New York).
 Mixed at Sear Sound, Sorcerer Sound and Sony Music Studios (New York City, New York).
 Mastered at Sony Music Studios.

References

2003 albums
Verve Records albums
Wayne Shorter albums
Grammy Award for Best Jazz Instrumental Album